Hibbertia empetrifolia, commonly known as trailing guinea-flower, is a species of flowering plant in the family Dilleniaceae and is endemic to south-eastern Australia. It is a low-lying to spreading shrub with wiry stems, oblong to lance-shaped leaves with the narrower end towards the base, and pale to bright yellow flowers arranged on the ends of branchlets, with five to nine stamens arranged on one side of the two carpels.

Description
Both surfaces of the leaves have simple, hooked or star-shaped hairs. There are between five and nine stamens arranged on one side of the two carpels. Flowering occurs in most months.

Taxonomy
This species was first formally described in 1817 by Swiss botanist Augustin Pyramus de Candolle in his book, Regni Vegetabilis Systema Naturale and was given the name Pleurandra empetrifolia. In 1974, Ruurd Dirk Hoogland changed the name to Hibbertia empetrifolia in the Kew Bulletin. The specific epithet (empetrifolia) refers to a similarity of the leaves to those in the genus Empetrum.

In 1998, Hellmut R. Toelken described three subspecies in the Journal of the Adelaide Botanic Gardens, and the names of two are accepted by the Australian Plant Census:
 Hibbertia empetrifolia (DC.) Hoogland subsp. empetrifolia; 
 Hibbertia empetrifolia subsp. radians Toelken that differs from the autonym in having star-shaped hairs with fewer branches.

Distribution and habitat
This guinea-flower occurs from south-east Queensland, through New South Wales and Victoria to Kangaroo Island in South Australia and in Tasmania. It grows in woodland and forest, scrambling over other vegetation. Subspecies empetrifolia is found on the coast and tablelands of New South Wales, coastal areas of Victoria east of Port Phillip Bay, the east coast of Tasmania. Subspecies radians only occurs in south-eastern South Australia.

Use in horticulture
Hibbertia empetrifolia is regarded as one of the best suited species of Hibbertia for cultivation in gardens, preferring a well-drained situation with some shade. It is frost resistant and withstands some dryness, but performs best with adequate moisture.

References

empetrifolia
Flora of New South Wales
Flora of Victoria (Australia)
Flora of South Australia
Flora of Queensland
Flora of Tasmania
Taxa named by Augustin Pyramus de Candolle
Plants described in 1817